Miloslav Popović (born 9 August 1952) is a Yugoslav boxer. He competed in the men's light heavyweight event at the 1976 Summer Olympics.

References

1952 births
Living people
Yugoslav male boxers
Olympic boxers of Yugoslavia
Boxers at the 1976 Summer Olympics
Place of birth missing (living people)
Light-heavyweight boxers